Podturen is a village and a municipality in Međimurje County, Croatia. The population of the municipality in the 2011 census was 3,873. The majority of the population are Croats.

The municipality consists of the following villages: Podturen, Celine, Ferketinec, Miklavec, Novakovec and Sivica. Also part of the municipality is a Roma settlement, Lončarevo, around 500 metres from Podturen, which is also a part of a village Podturen.

There are 24 entrepreneurs with 121 employees and 42 craftsmen in the community.
Kerkaszentkiraly (SW Hungary) and Podturen in Croatia signed an agreement on building a bridge over the Mura river as well as a 3 km road connecting the two towns.

Mayor of Kerkaszentkiraly Zoltan Pal told MTI that Slovenia would also join the project, a small area of which is wedged between the Hungarian and Croatian towns.

The mayor noted that ties had been close between villages on either side of the border before World War II, when many Croats owned and cultivated vineyards on the Hungarian side and used to take a ferry to cross the river.

References

 

Municipalities of Croatia
Populated places in Međimurje County